Milionia callimorpha is a species of moth in the family Geometridae described by Oberthür in 1894. It is found in New Guinea, including Fergusson Island and the Louisiade Archipelago.

Subspecies
Milionia callimorpha callimorpha
Milionia callimorpha euroa Jordan & Rothschild, 1895 (Fergusson Island)
Milionia callimorpha brevis Rothschild, 1898 (Louisiade Archipelago)

References 

Ennominae
Moths described in 1894
Moths of New Guinea